The pale-headed munia (Lonchura pallida) is a species of estrildid finch found in Indonesia. It is found in artificial landscapes, subtropical and tropical lowlands, dry shrubland and grassland habitat. The status of the species is evaluated as Least Concern.

Origin
Origin and phylogeny has been obtained by Antonio Arnaiz-Villena et al. Estrildinae may have originated in India and dispersed thereafter (towards Africa and Pacific Ocean habitats).

References

External links 
 BirdLife Species Factsheet

pale-headed munia
Birds of Wallacea
pale-headed munia